Mesocacia is a genus of longhorn beetles of the subfamily Lamiinae, containing the following species:

 Mesocacia elongata Breuning, 1936
 Mesocacia multimaculata (Pic, 1925)
 Mesocacia pulla Zhang, 1989 †
 Mesocacia punctifasciata Gressitt, 1940
 Mesocacia rugicollis Gressitt, 1940

References

Mesosini